Tetachoya is a former Salinan settlement in Monterey County, California. 

It was located near Mission San Antonio de Padua, in the Santa Lucia Range. Its precise location is unknown.

References

Salinan populated places
Santa Lucia Range
Former settlements in Monterey County, California
Former Native American populated places in California
Lost Native American populated places in the United States